This is a list of comedy and humor podcasts. They are listed in alphabetical order.

List

References 

Comedy and humor podcasts
Comedy and humor